The Automobile Driving Museum is an automotive museum located at 610 Lairport Street, El Segundo, California, USA.

Its mission is to "collect, preserve, exhibit and ride in historic vehicles." It contains about 130 classic, antique, and vintage automobiles created between 1886 and 2000, of which roughly half are on display at any time. Visitors are permitted to touch and sit in most cars, and on Sunday Car Rides, experience driving around in classic vehicles. Its collection includes:

 1932 Plymouth Brewster Town Car, owned by Eleanor Roosevelt
 1936 Packard touring phaeton, given by Franklin Delano Roosevelt to Joseph Stalin
 1955 Packard Caribbean Convertible, given by Howard Hughes to his wife, Jean Peters

References 
 Automobile Driving Museum
 North American Reciprocal Museum Association entry
 Little Known LA video
 See California article
 I Drive SoCal article
 New England Auto Museum article
 Congressional Record, Speech by Adam Schiff, June 11, 2002, Page 10201.
 Car, Gregory Votolato, Reaktion Books, 2015, page 268.

Automobile museums in California